WROV could refer to:

 WROV-FM, a radio station (96.3 FM), licensed to Martinsville, Virginia, United States.

Former stations:
 WGMN, a radio station (1240 AM), licensed to Roanoke, Virginia, United States, which used the WROV call sign from 1946 to 1998.
 WROV-TV, a defunct UHF television station previously located in Roanoke, Virginia, United States.